Lohpurush is a 1999 Bollywood Action film directed by Hersh Kinnu, starring Dharmendra, Jaya Prada, Mohan Joshi and Ashish Vidyarthi in pivotal roles.

Plot 
Ajeet Singh is an honest and loyal bodyguard of Chief Minister. Corrupt party leader Bhola Pandey wants to kill the Chief Minister to occupy the post of CM. Ajeet Singh is falsely implicated for killing his wife and sentenced to life imprisonment.

Cast
 Dharmendra as Ajeet Singh 
 Jaya Prada
 Rohini Hattangadi as Chief Minister
 Mohan Joshi
 Monica Bedi
 Deep Dhillon
 Ashish Vidyarthi
 Mukesh Rishi
 Deepak Shirke
 Rohit Kumar

Music
"Bairan Bani Ye Raina Hai" - Ila Arun
"Bandh Kamre Mein Ek Ladka Ho" - Kumar Sanu, Alisha Chinoy
"Main Jatt Ludhiyanewala" - Udit Narayan, Alka Yagnik
 "Rooth Ke Jaanewali Nakhrewali" - Kumar Sanu, Poornima

References

External links
 

1999 films
1990s Hindi-language films
Films scored by Dilip Sen-Sameer Sen
Indian action films